Bråkdalsbelgen is a mountain in Sel Municipality in Innlandet county, Norway. The mountain is surrounded by several other notable mountains including Ljosåbelgen, Hoggbeitet, Smiukampen, and Sagtinden, all three of which overlook Verkilsdal, a small river valley. A small lake, Verkilsdalsvatnet, is located at the base of Bråkdalsbelgen.

See also
List of mountains of Norway by height

References

Sel
Mountains of Innlandet